Maple Creek Airport  is located adjacent to Maple Creek, Saskatchewan, Canada.

At 12 noon 3 January 2011 Saskatchewan Air Ambulance Lifeguard 3 touched down and slid off the runway due to snow on the runway, causing damage to the King Air B200 aircraft.

See also 
 List of airports in Saskatchewan

References 

Registered aerodromes in Saskatchewan